Once In A Blue Moon: A Celebration of Australian Musicals is a 1994 television special featuring songs from Australian musicals from the 1950s to the 1990s.

The special was staged as a television concert, performed live before an invited audience. It featured many leading musical theatre performers including Nancye Hayes, Geraldine Turner, Simon Burke, Philip Quast, Tony Sheldon, Robyn Archer, Judi Connelli and Jodie Gillies.  The Melbourne Symphony Orchestra conducted by Brian Stacey accompanied the performers.

Soundtrack

A soundtrack was released by ABC Music.  It was nominated for Best Original Soundtrack, Cast or Show Album at the 1995 ARIA Awards.

Track listing
 CD/Cassette

References

Australian Broadcasting Corporation original programming
Australian musicals
English-language television shows
Television shows set in Australia
1994 albums